Bill Bergson, Master Detective (original Swedish title Mästerdetektiven Blomkvist) is a children's novel by Astrid Lindgren. It is the first in the series about the Swedish boy detective, in English translation named Bill Bergson (Swedish name: Kalle Blomkvist).

Plot summary 
Bill Bergson investigates his friend's mysterious cousin, who is behaving suspiciously, and solves the mystery of a jewel robbery.

Bill and five of his friends also play a mock war game, with the White Roses and the Red Roses vying for possession of an unusual stone.

Films
There is a film based on the book, Bill Bergson, Master Detective, produced in 1947.

References
Bill Bergson, Master Detective on the Astrid Lindgren website
Bill Bergson, Master Detective English editions at WorldCat

1946 children's books
Novels by Astrid Lindgren
Children's mystery novels
Swedish children's novels

ja:名探偵カッレくん